Cibaca may refer to:

 Cibaca (brand), a toothpaste brand owned by Colgate-Palmolive
 Cibaca Geetmala, a Hindi-language radio countdown show
 Čibača, a village in Croatia